The Crescent was a part-completed Regency-style terrace in central Birmingham, England. First proposed in 1788, construction started and discontinued in 1795, and the terrace was finally demolished in the mid- to late 1960s. Like other late 18th and early 19th century crescent terraces in Britain and Ireland, it took its inspiration from The Crescent (later Royal Crescent), Bath, designed by John Wood the Younger and built 1767 to 1774.

The developer in Birmingham was Charles Norton and the architect was John Rawsthorne. The land was leased from the Foundation of the Schools of King Edward VI on a 120-year term.

Only twelve of the houses, mostly in the two wings, were built by 1795, when a building depression resulting from the war with France brought construction to a stop. Work never resumed and eventually other buildings (including a factory known as "Crescent Works") were erected on the site, in a street called "The Crescent", following the original curved layout. The Crescent ran north of, and roughly parallel to, the present Cambridge Street, the concave side facing northwards from a hilltop, overlooking the Birmingham and Fazeley Canal (completed in August 1789), and the area now known as Ladywood, which was then countryside. A later canal wharf between The Crescent and the canal was named "Crescent Wharf", and the vista became filled with factories, workshops and warehouses.

The Crescent Theatre was based in one of the buildings in the east wing of The Crescent from its first production in 1932 until 1964, and takes its name from there.

Another proposed development on the same site, the civic centre, started in the 1930s, was also abandoned due to World War II.

Neither the street nor any of its buildings remain. The site of The Crescent was redeveloped and is now occupied by the four tower blocks of the Civic Centre Estate, one of which is called "Crescent Tower".

References

External links 

 Old Crescent Theatre, Birmingham 1960 photograph by Phyllis Nicklin

Buildings and structures in Birmingham, West Midlands
Demolished buildings and structures in the West Midlands (county)
Regency architecture in England
Crescents (architecture)
Houses completed in 1788
Streets in Birmingham, West Midlands
1788 establishments in England